The 2018 Pan American Cross Country Cup took place on February 17, 2018. in La Libertad, El Salvador.

Medalists

Race results

Senior men's race (10 km)

Junior (U20) men's race (8 km)

Senior women's race (8 km)

Junior (U20) women's race (6 km)

Medal table (unofficial)

Note: Totals include both individual and team medals, with medals in the team competition counting as one medal.

Participation
According to an unofficial count,  athletes from 20 countries participated.

 (0)
 (0)
 (0)
 (0)
 (0)
 (0)
 (0)
 (0)
 (0)
 (0)
 (0)
 (0)
 (0)
 (0)
 (0)
 (0)
 (0)
 (0)
 (0)
 (0)
 (0)

See also
 2018 in athletics (track and field)

References

Pan American Cross Country Cup
Pan American Cross Country Cup
Pan American Cross Country Cup
Pan American Cross Country Cup
Cross country running in El Salvador